is a former Japanese football player.

Playing career
Tateishi was born in Chiba Prefecture on April 22, 1974. After graduating from Horikoshi High School, he joined JEF United Ichihara (later JEF United Chiba) in 1993. However he could hardly play in the match behind Kenichi Shimokawa. In 1998, he moved to Avispa Fukuoka on loan. However he could hardly play in the match behind Hideki Tsukamoto. In 1999, he returned to JEF United. Although Shimokawa left the club in 2001, he could not become a regular goalkeeper behind Ryo Kushino. In August 2005, he became a regular goalkeeper. At 2005 J.League Cup Final, the club won the penalty shootout 5–4, defeating Gamba Osaka. He saved Yasuhito Endo penalty shootout shot and was elected MVP award. Although he played as regular goalkeeper until 2007, his opportunity to play decreased behind Masahiro Okamoto in 2008 and he retired end of 2008 season.

Club statistics

References

External links

JEF United Chiba

1974 births
Living people
Horikoshi High School alumni
Association football people from Chiba Prefecture
Japanese footballers
J1 League players
JEF United Chiba players
Avispa Fukuoka players
Association football goalkeepers